The Tomb of the Diver, located in Paestum, is known for the mysterious subject matter of the frescos adorning the walls. The origin of this tomb is somewhat mysterious as well. There has been scholarly debate about whether the tomb was built by a Greek settlement occupying Poseidonia or by an ancient Italic tribe from a more southern region of Italy. The tomb was built with five large stone slabs, each hosting a fresco attributed one of two artists. The four walls are decorated with scenery of a symposium which is uncommon for a funerary context. The ceiling is a true mystery and the namesake of the tomb: a lone diver leaping into a pool of water. This figure is unique to this tomb, no other ancient Mediterranean artworks have imagery comparable to the diver.

Description 
The Tomb of the Diver is an archaeological monument, built in about 470 BCE and found by the Italian archaeologist Mario Napoli on 3 June 1968 during his excavation of a small necropolis about 1.5 km south of the Greek city of Paestum in Magna Graecia, in what is now southern Italy. It is a grave made of five local limestone slabs forming the four lateral walls and the roof, the floor being excavated in the natural bedrock. The five slabs, carefully bonded with plaster, formed a chamber about 215 × 100 × 80 cm (7.1 × 3.3 × 2.6 ft) in size. All five slabs forming the monument were painted on the interior sides using a true fresco technique. The paintings on the four walls depict a symposium scene, while the cover slab shows the famous scene that gives the tomb its name: a young man diving into a curling and waving stream of water. The north and south walls of the tomb each display three chaise sofas occupied by five reclining figures, either guests of the symposium or hired entertainment for said guests. All reclining figures are adorned with crowns, and there are additional crowns available on the three legged tables for food and drink. The northern wall shows one guest engaging in kottabos on the leftmost couch, an ancient game of tossing wine from a cup at a target. On the rightmost couch, a display of pederasty shows a young man resisting the advances of the older male guest. The west wall shows three figures either arriving late or exiting the symposium; an older man with a walking stick on the left, an undressed man with only a stole around his shoulders, and a woman playing a flute on the right. All three are adorned with wreathes. The east wall has a lone nude servant boy holding an oenochoe next to a serving table holding a krater and garland of olive leaves.

In the interior of the tomb, only a few objects were found: near the corpse (widely supposed to be a young man, despite the heavily deteriorated state of the skeleton) were a turtle shell, two arýballoi and an Attic lekythos. This last object, in black-figure technique from about 480 BC, helped the discoverer and other scholars to date the tomb to about 470 BC.

Origin 

There is some debate about which civilization to attribute the building of this tomb, some say the deceased is Greek while others argue that he may be from an Italic tribe south of Paestum. When the tomb was discovered, its surprising frescos revealed its importance, as they appear to be the only Greek frescos with figurative imagery from any ancient period. Likewise, no other Greek tomb has been discovered with similar figurative ornamentation. This was presumably inspired by the many Etruscan painted tombs; Paestum was at the time a few miles from the border of the Greek and Etruscan zones of influence at the River Sele. Wall-paintings in other types of building were common in the Greek world, but survivals are extremely rare. Many scholars argue that this tomb is decidedly Greek due to the subject matter of symposium, which was not a social activity the Etruscans were known to engage in. The local Campanians had taken control of Paestum by about 400 BCE left many painted tombs, but they mostly show an obsession with horses and equine sport. Several of these are also in the museum in Paestum.

Arguments have also been made that this tomb could have been made by an Italic tribe south of Paestum due to the style of vessel on the east wall. Some scholars have identified this as a volute krater. An identifying feature of volute kraters is the scroll like detail at the top of the handles, towards the mouth of the vessel, which is not present on the krater in the Tomb of the Diver. The eastern wall instead resembles a krater-kantharos, a style of vessel placed at the feet of a corpse in Italian tombs south of Poseidonia during the same period as the Tomb of the Diver. A krater-kantharos is quickly thrown and finished with a matte paint, loosely resembling a volute krater but with a wider body and less ornamental handles, and again was made for funerary purposes.

Other frescoed tombs from the fifth century BCE have similar stylistic adornments to the Tomb of the Diver, for example the Tomb of the Palmettes, found in Macedonia, is adorned with its namesake palmettes which can likewise be found on the four corners of the ceiling of the Tomb of the Diver. The presence of Egyptian blue pigment in the fresco tells us that the deceased was a wealthy individual because Egyptian blue was not a commonly available color for frescoes and was therefore expensive.  Analyzing the pigments used in this tomb in comparison with Lucanian frescos predating it, as well as with other Greek frescos from the same period, has led to the conclusion that this tomb is the result of an artisanal style of painting local to Paestum.

Symbolism

Symposium Scenes 

It is considered odd by many scholars that the Tomb of the Diver hosts scenery of Greek symposium, mainly because it is not a traditional funerary subject. There is a theory that the central nude figure on the west wall is in fact a representation of the deceased, and his lack of dress in the scene may be interpreted as an example of formal undress which is seen with Greek gods and heroic deaths. Formal undress is a tool used in pottery and sculpture of this time to communicate an elevated state. Combined with the drinking of Dionysus' wine, the nudity of the figures may be interpreted as a sort of symbolism for this higher consciousness.  If the members of the party on the west wall are just arriving, it can be interpreted that the remaining two seats on the lounges are open for the older man and the central nude and that the girl with the flute is another entertainer for these men. If the west wall shows these figures departing the party however, it is thought that perhaps this is a celebratory send off for that central figure.

The men reclining on the northern and southern walls display acts of pederasty, the socially accepted romantic relationship between an older man and a younger boy in ancient Greek culture. A symposium was a common location for these types of relationships to develop because they were a private space for elite Greek men to escape the realities of their daily lives.  Sex and alcohol went hand in hand in these spaces. The depictions of symposium is prolific in ancient Greek art, but it was most commonly seen on pottery intended to be used at the symposium itself. These ceramic cups and bowls were made in humor, covered in scenes of animalistic desire and of hungover men sick the next morning. The fact that this tomb bares frescos of such an informal subject is an anomaly.

The Diver 
The diver himself has also puzzled historians with his connection to the symposium. Some scholars note that the direction of the diver's leap would land him in the raised cup of the symposiasts playing kottabos on the northern wall, whose tossed wine would then land in the cup of the man in front of him, but this path only truly comes to life when the ceiling imagined vertically above the northern wall like an extension of the scene. The concept of diving itself is not new to Ancient Greek death, and is often utilized in archaic poetry in scenes of passionate loss such as the death of a loved one. In that regard, this scene may be the only one with a clear connection to death in the tomb. It would be a symbolic scene evoking the passage to the otherworld. The diver leaping into the water (or ocean) may be a representation of the theme of leaping into the unknown, while the structure from which he launches himself may symbolise the limit of the known world. According to Pierre Lévêque, the "diver plunges into the sea (death), but also into life (eternity), where he will rediscover the primordial waters of life".

Attribution 
Two masters have been distinguished, with the south wall being painted by a less impressive artist than the others. The work of the Maestro del Tuffatore copies the style of red attic painting in the way the figures are outlined. This is best seen in the symposium scenes, where the reclining figures' anatomy is well described and their likeness is highly individualistic. The Maestro del Tuttafore also has overlapping and foreshortening in his composition, creating a complex yet believable scene of figures reclining amongst one another. The only wall which does not seem to follow this style is the eastern wall, with the lone serve boy whose form is only defined by a minimal contour, which scholars have attributed to the Maestro della Lastra Sud. This wall does include its own details of mastery, such as the distinctive outline of the oenochoe implying a silver material in comparison to the solid form of the krater, which is known to be ceramic. The Maestro della Lastra Sud is still considered the inferior artist, however, due to the lack of complexity in his composition and the minimal detail in the wall overall.

See also 

 Etruscan art
 Pederasty
 Pederasty in Ancient Greece
 Tomb of the Augurs
 Tomb of the Bulls
 Tomb of the Dancers
 Tomb of the Leopards
 Tomb of the Triclinium

Notes

References

 
 
 R. Ross Holloway. The Tomb of the Diver, in American Journal of Archaeology, Vol. 110, n. 3, July 2006 (pp. 365–388). 
 Angela Pontrandolfo, Agnès Rouveret, Marina Cipriani. The painted tombs of Paestum. Pandemos Editions, Paestum, 2004 ; other versions: French ; German ; Italian ;
 Agnès Rouveret. La Tombe du Plongeur et les fresques étrusques: témoignages sur la peinture grecque, dans Revue Archéologique, 1974, Fascicule 1, pp. 15–32.
 Pierre Somville. La tombe du plongeur à Paestum, dans Revue de l'histoire de Religions.Paris, PUF, Tome 196, fascicule 1, July 1979, pp. 41–51.
 Daisy Warland. La Tombe du Plongeur: Étude de la relation entre le symposion et le plongeon. dans Revue de l'histoire de Religions. Paris, PUF, Tome 213, fascicule 2, 1996, p. 143–60 – Abstract on line 23 August 2007. accessed 20 September 2007.
 Daisy Warland. Que représente la fresque de la paroi Ouest de la tombe au plongeur de Poseidonia?, in Kernos, 1999, n. 12, p. 195–206.
"The Tomb of the Diver and the frescoed tombs in Paestum (southern Italy): New insights from a comparative archaeometric study" Alberghina MF, Germinario C, Bartolozzi G, Bracci S, Grifa C, et al. (2020) The Tomb of the Diver and the frescoed tombs in Paestum (southern Italy): New insights from a comparative archaeometric study. PLOS ONE 15(4): e0232375. https://doi.org/10.1371/journal.pone.0232375

Ancient Greek painting
5th-century BC Greek art
Art of Magna Graecia
Cilento
Fresco paintings in Campania
LGBT history in Italy
Ancient LGBT history
Buildings and structures in Campania
Paestum (ancient city)
Archaeological sites in Campania